Andrew Heafitz is an American inventor. He is the VP of product development at Terrafugia, a company developing a flying car.

Early life and education
Heaftiz grew up in Newton, Massachusetts and attended Newton South High School.
He was awarded his first patent when he was 19 for a camera shutter. He was the founder of TacShot, a rocket-propelled camera capable of being quickly launched and deployed to photograph an area from overhead.

Heafitz holds a SB and MS (2000) from MIT.

Awards and honors
In 2003, he was recognized on the MIT Technology Review's TR100 list.

He received the MIT Lemelson Student Inventor prize in 2002.

References

Living people
21st-century American inventors
Year of birth missing (living people)
Massachusetts Institute of Technology alumni
People from Newton, Massachusetts
People from Cambridge, Massachusetts
Newton South High School alumni